Achard syndrome is a syndrome consisting of arachnodactyly, receding lower jaw, and joint laxity limited to the hands and feet. Hypermobility and subluxations of the joints, increased lateral excursion of the patellas and other findings reflect the increased ligament laxity. It is clinically similar to Marfan syndrome.

Symptoms
Presentation is the following:
 Small thumbs
 Joint laxity in hands
 Joint laxity in feet
 Brachycephaly
 Short mandibular rami

Diagnosis

Treatment

References

Further reading

External links 

Syndromes affecting joints
Musculoskeletal disorders
Syndromes with dysmelia
Syndromes affecting the jaw